Magnus Manhammar (born 1980) is a Swedish politician. From September 2014 to September 2022, he served as Member of the Riksdag representing the constituency of Blekinge County.

References 

Living people
1980 births
Place of birth missing (living people)
21st-century Swedish politicians
Members of the Riksdag 2014–2018
Members of the Riksdag 2018–2022
Members of the Riksdag 2022–2026
Members of the Riksdag from the Social Democrats